Harvey Bennett may refer to:

Harvey Bennett Sr. (1925–2004), Canadian ice hockey goaltender for the Boston Bruins
Harvey Bennett Jr. (born 1952), American ice hockey centre and son of Harvey Sr.
Harvey Bennett (born  1934), American tourist detained for espionage in the Soviet Union